The 1977 Dutch Open was a Grand Prix tennis tournament staged in Hilversum, Netherlands. The tournament was played on outdoor clay courts and was held from 12 July until 18 July 1977. It was the 21st edition of the tournament. Patrick Proisy won the singles title.

Finals

Singles
 Patrick Proisy defeated  Lito Álvarez 6–0, 6–2, 6–0
 It was Proisy's first singles title of the year and the second of his career.

Doubles
 José Higueras /  Antonio Muñoz defeated  Jean-Louis Haillet /  François Jauffret 6–1, 6–4, 2–6, 6–1

References

External links
 ITF tournament edition details

Dutch Open (tennis)
Dutch Open (tennis)
Dutch Open
Dutch Open
Dutch Open (tennis), 1977